Inversija was a cargo airline based in Riga, Latvia. It started operations in March 1991 and undertook all types of cargo operations, as well as maintenance work for third parties. Its main base was Riga International Airport. In 2012, the airline ceased all operations.

Fleet

The Inversija fleet consisted of the following aircraft (at March 2007):

2 Ilyushin Il-76T
1 Ilyushin Il-76TD

References

Defunct airlines of Latvia
Airlines established in 1991
Airlines disestablished in 2012
Companies based in Riga
2012 disestablishments in Latvia
Latvian companies established in 1991